Elaeocarpus arnhemicus, commonly known as elaeocarpus, blue plum, bony quandony or Arnhem Land quandong, is species of flowering plant in the family Elaeocarpaceae and is native to northern Australia, New Guinea, Timor and certain other islands in the Indonesian Archipelago. It is a tree with narrow elliptic to lance-shaped or egg-shaped leaves with serrated edges, racemes of white or cream-coloured flowers and metallic blue fruit.

Description
Elaeocarpus arnhemicus is a tree.

This species is best identified among other Elaeocarpus species when in flower.

Taxonomy and naming
Elaeocarpus arnhemicus was first formally described in 1868 by Ferdinand von Mueller in his book Fragmenta Phytographiae Australiae.

It is placed in the Fissipetalum group of Elaeocarpus species.

Distribution and habitat
In 2001 the known range was expanded to Java, Timor, Flores, Sumba and Sulawesi. After receiving some new specimens, M. J. E. Coode, expert Elaeocarpus taxonomist, realised that a few old specimens from two collection localities that he and his colleague Raymond Weibel had never been able to identify, were actually E. arnhemicus, considerably expanding its range.

See also
 List of Elaeocarpus species

References

arnhemicus
Flora of the Northern Territory
Flora of Queensland
Flora of New Guinea
Plants described in 1868
Taxa named by Ferdinand von Mueller